Ataa was a settlement in the Disko Bay region of western Greenland.

History 
The settlement was abandoned around 1960. It served as a backdrop for the 1997 Danish film Smilla's Sense of Snow, an adaptation of Peter Høeg's 1992 novel Miss Smilla's Feeling for Snow.

References 

Disko Bay
Former populated places in Greenland